Ahmet Gülay (born 13 January 2003) is a Turkish professional footballer who plays as a left back for Alanyaspor on loan from Beşiktaş.

Professional career
A youth product ofAvcılar Belediye and Beşiktaş, Gülay signed a professional contract with Beşiktaş in the summer of 2020. Shortly after, on 26 August 2020, Gülay joined Alanyaspor on a 2-year loan from Beşiktaş. Gülay made his professional debut with Alanyaspor in a 6-0 Süper Lig win over Hatayspor on 4 October 2020.

International career
Gülay represented the Turkey U23s in their winning campaign at the 2021 Islamic Solidarity Games.

Honours
Turkey U23
Islamic Solidarity Games: 2021

References

External links
 
 

2003 births
Living people
Sportspeople from Trabzon
Turkish footballers
Turkey youth international footballers
Beşiktaş J.K. footballers
Sivasspor footballers
Süper Lig players
Alanyaspor footballers
Association football fullbacks